S.S.C. Napoli returned to Serie A, following a couple of years in Serie B, where the club had rebuilt itself following the disastrous 1997-98 season, when it scored merely 14 points from 34 games.

Napoli was relegated once more, when a win against Fiorentina in the final round proved redundant due to all the other teams involved in the battle (to avoid relegation) also winning their matches; including a shocking win for Lecce against title-chasers Lazio. The investment in several new players came back to haunt Napoli when those players did not perform, causing bankruptcy three years later.

Squad

Goalkeepers
  Alberto Fontana
  Francesco Mancini
  Luca Mondini

Defenders
  Rabiu Afolabi
  Dario Baccin
  Francesco Baldini
  Antonio Bocchetti
  Salvatore Fresi
  Steinar Nilsen
  Facundo Quiroga
  Abdelilah Saber
  Emanuele Troise

Midfielders
  Claudio Husaín
  Marek Jankulovski
  Oscar Magoni
  Matuzalém
  Francesco Moriero
  Fabio Pecchia
  Mauricio Pineda
  Giacomo Tedesco
  José Luís Vidigal

Attackers
  Amauri
  Nicola Amoruso
  Claudio Bellucci
  Edmundo
  Antonio Floro Flores
  David Sesa
  Roberto Stellone

Serie A

Matches

Top scorers
  Nicola Amoruso 10
  Fabio Pecchia 6
  Edmundo 4
  Marek Jankulovski 3

References

S.S.C. Napoli seasons
Napoli